Zadak (also Romanized as Zādak; also known as Azdak) is a village in Quchan Atiq Rural District, in the Central District of Quchan County, Razavi Khorasan Province, Iran. At the 2006 census, its population was 83, in 26 families.

References 

Populated places in Quchan County